Windsor—Sandwich was an electoral riding in Ontario, Canada. It was created in 1934 and was abolished with the 1967 election as a result of redistribution. The area was restructured as Windsor West from 1967 to 1975, during which time it was represented by New Democrats Hugh Peacock and Ted Bounsall.

Windsor—Sandwich was re-established for the 1975 election, and was again eliminated through redistribution in 1996. The district formally ceased to exist with the 1999 provincial election, and was incorporated into the new districts of Windsor West and Essex.

Members of Provincial Parliament

References

Former provincial electoral districts of Ontario
Politics of Windsor, Ontario